is a railway station in Hyogo-ku, Kobe, Hyōgo Prefecture, Japan.

Lines
Kobe Electric Railway
Arima Line

Adjacent stations

Sources

External links
 

Railway stations in Hyōgo Prefecture
Stations of Kobe Electric Railway
Railway stations in Japan opened in 1928